Alicyclobacillus contaminans is a species of Gram positive, strictly aerobic, bacterium. The bacteria are acidophilic and produce endospores. It was first isolated during a survey from both orange juice, and soil in Fuji City, Japan. The species was first described in 2007, and the name is derived from the Latin contaminans (contaminating).

The optimum growth temperature for A. contaminans is 50-55 °C, and can grow in the 35-60 °C range. The optimum pH is 4.0-4.5, and cannot grow at pH 3.0 or pH 6.0.

A. contaminans was found during a Japanese survey of various beverages and environments, which also discovered 5 other species of Alicyclobacillus: A. fastidiosus, A. kakegawensis, A. macrosporangiidus, A. sacchari, and A. shizuokensis.

References

Gram-positive bacteria
Bacteria described in 2007
Bacillales